Kubota Spears Funabashi Tokyo Bay (commonly known as the Kubota Spears) is a Japanese rugby union team based in Funabashi, Chiba participating in the Japan Rugby League One. The team rebranded as Kubota Spears Funabashi Tokyo Bay ahead of the rebranding of the Top League as the Japan Rugby League One in 2022.

Current squad

The Kubota Spears Funabashi Tokyo Bay squad for the 2023 season is:

 * denotes players qualified to play for the Japan on dual nationality or residency grounds.

Former players
 Willie Ofahengaue
 Joe Roff - Fullback/Wing
 Barrie-Jon Mather - Centre/Wing
 Marty Veale - Lock
Kōtarō Nakamura - Wing/Fullback
 Jason O'Halloran
Cameron Pither
Shunji Ishikura - Lock
Joshua Fuimaono
 Justin Sampson
 Toutai Kefu
 Duane Vermeulen

References

External links
 Kubota Spears - Official Website

Japan Rugby League One teams
Rugby clubs established in 1978
Sports teams in Chiba Prefecture
1978 establishments in Japan